The 19567 / 68 Tuticorin - Okha Vivek Express is an express train belonging to Indian Railways - Western Zone that runs between  and  in India.

Coach composition

The train has standard ICF rakes with a max speed of 110 kmph. The train consists of 21 coaches :

 1 AC II Tier
 4 AC III Tier
 10 Sleeper Coaches
 4 General Unreserved
 2 Seating cum Luggage Rake

As is customary with most train services in India, coach composition may be amended at the discretion of Indian Railways depending on demand.

Service

The 19567/Tuticorin - Okha Vivek Express has an average speed of 51 km/hr and covers 2711 km in 53 hrs 05 mins.

The 19568/Okha - Tuticorin Vivek Express has an average speed of 53 km/hr and covers 2711 km in 51 hrs 35 mins.

Route

,
,
,
,
,
,
,
,
,
,
,
,
,
,
,
,

Schedule

Traction

From tuticorin till ahmedabad, it is hauled by an erode/RPM based wap-7, after which from ahmedabad till okha, it is hauled by vatva/sabarmati based WDP-4 till it's destination and vice versa

Direction Reversal

Train is reversed one time at:

 Erode Junction.

References

External links
19567 Vivek Express at India Rail Info
19568 Vivek Express at India Rail Info

Transport in Okha
Rail transport in Gujarat
Rail transport in Maharashtra
Rail transport in Karnataka
Rail transport in Andhra Pradesh
Rail transport in Tamil Nadu
Transport in Thoothukudi
Vivek Express trains
Railway services introduced in 2011